Most of the dorsal metacarpal arteries arise from the dorsal carpal arch and run downward on the second, third, and fourth dorsal interossei of the hand and bifurcate into the dorsal digital arteries.  Near their origin, they anastomose with the deep palmar arch by perforating arteries.  They also anastomose with common palmar digital arteries (from the superficial palmar arch), also via perforating arteries.

The first dorsal metacarpal artery arises directly from the radial artery before it crosses through the two heads of the first dorsal interosseous muscle.

References

External links
  - "Dorsum of the hand, deep dissection, posterior view"

Arteries of the upper limb